Dick Jacobs (29 March 1918 – 20 May 1988) was an American musician, conductor, arranger, orchestrator, music director and an artists-and-repertoire director for several record labels (Coral, Decca, Brunswick and Springboard). He helped Jackie Wilson, Buddy Holly, Bobby Darin and others early in their careers in the late 1950s and early 1960s.

Life and career

Jacobs was born in New York City, United States, and graduated from New York University. During World War II he served in the United States Army, then returned to the city and spent several years arranging for Tommy Dorsey, then partnered with Sy Oliver to pursue freelance arranging work. 

When he was hired to be the musical director for the television series, Your Hit Parade, for its 1957–58 season, he replaced most of the existing studio orchestra members with his own choices including Dick Hyman, Don Lamond, Al Caiola and Jerome Richardson. At that point, the Hit Parade orchestra became one of the first on-screen orchestras to become integrated. In 1953 he produced a number of acts, including the McGuire Sisters and Teresa Brewer, and by 1958 had a hit single, the theme tune from the movie Kathy-O. In 1956 his recording of "Man with the Golden Arm" sold over one million copies as a single and was awarded a gold disc.

According to The Ultimate Book of Songs and Artists, by Joel Whitburn, Jacobs's biggest hits were "Main Title" and "Molly-O" (1956), "Petticoats of Portugal" (1956), and "Fascination" (1957).

Jacobs brought a lush instrumental orchestral sound to a number of rock and roll songs in the late 1950s, notably those for Buddy Holly and Cirino Colacrai and his vocal quartet, the Bowties. Eventually retiring in the late 1970s, he wrote Who Wrote That Song?, a reference book on popular songs and songwriters.

He died in 1988 in New York City, at the age of 70.

Selected discography

Singles
Coral 61606 - "Molly-O" / "Butternut" (1956)	
Coral 61692 - "Seven Wonders of the World" / "Theme from "East of Eden"" (1956)
Coral 61724 - "Petticoats of Portugal" / "Song of the Vagabonds-Only A Rose" (1956)	
Coral 61794 - "Big Beat" / "Tower's Trot and Then You Do That Step" (1957)	
Coral 61864 - "Fascination" / "Summertime in Venice" (1957)
Coral 61907 - "Place Pigalle" / "Lovely Ladies of Milano" (1957)	
Coral 61951 - "Mambo No. 5" / "Marchin' Drummer Blues" (1958)	
Coral 62086 - "A Touch of Pink" / "Happy People of Monterrey" (1959)

Albums
Main Title (with George Cates Orchestra & Chorus) - Coral CRL-57065
The Man With the Golden Baton - Coral CRL-57127
Themes from Horror Movies - Coral CRL-57240
Written In the Stars (The Zodiac Suite) - Coral CRL-57339
Fascination - Vocalion VL-3672

References

Bibliography
 Press, Jaques Cattell (Ed.). ASCAP Biographical Dictionary of Composers, Authors and Publishers, 4th edition, R. R. Bowker, 1980.
 Nite, Norm N.; Clark, Dick. Rock on. The Illustrated Encyclopedia of Rock n' Roll. The Solid Gold Years, Harper & Row, 1982.
 Whitburn, Joel. The Billboard Book of Top 40 Hits, 5th edition, Watson-Guptill Publications, 1992.

External links
 
 Dick Jacobs recordings at the Discography of American Historical Recordings.

1918 births
1988 deaths
Record producers from New York (state)
Songwriters from New York (state)
American male conductors (music)
20th-century American conductors (music)
20th-century American businesspeople
Classical musicians from New York (state)
20th-century American male musicians
United States Army personnel of World War II
New York University alumni
American male songwriters